Thomas Kent Carter (born December 18, 1956) is an American actor.

In films, he is mostly known for his many comedic performances, such as the street-smart Chester in Seems Like Old Times and the karaoke-singing Iceman in Ski Patrol. He is also known for playing slightly nervous characters, such as the rollerskating chef Nauls in John Carpenter's The Thing, as well as the unfortunate National Guardsman, Cribbs, in Walter Hill's Southern Comfort.

On TV, he is known for playing Michael "Mike" Fulton, an elementary schoolteacher, on the NBC series Punky Brewster and Mylo Williams on the Disney Channel series Good Morning, Miss Bliss. Carter is also well known for playing the role of drug addicted Gary McCullough in the HBO miniseries The Corner, a performance that The Boston Globe said "perfectly captures the gentleness and passivity that can be addition's easiest conquest". Carter's first starring role on television was on Just Our Luck.

His acting debut was on an episode of Police Woman. Carter also made appearances on Good Times, The Sinbad Show, The Steve Harvey Show, A Different World, and in the television films Polly and its 1990 sequel.

Personal life
Carter grew up in the San Gabriel Valley area of Southern California.

On June 13, 1990, Carter was arrested after refusing to answer police officers' questions and babbling incoherently.  He resisted being arrested and was tasered three times. In December 1991, Carter was arrested after assaulting a woman and then stealing her car.

Filmography

References

External links

T.K. Carter(Aveleyman)

1956 births
Living people
20th-century American male actors
21st-century American male actors
African-American male actors
African-American male comedians
American male comedians
African-American stand-up comedians
American stand-up comedians
American male film actors
American male television actors
American male voice actors
Male actors from Los Angeles County, California
Male actors from New York City
Comedians from California
Comedians from New York City
20th-century American comedians
21st-century American comedians
20th-century African-American people
21st-century African-American people